The banyan tree in Lahaina, in Maui, Hawaii, United States, was planted on April 24, 1873, in Lahaina to mark the 50th anniversary of the arrival of first American Protestant mission. The banyan tree (Ficus benghalensis) known in Hawaiian as paniana, located in the Courthouse Square, which was renamed Banyan Tree Park covering 1.94 acres, is not only the largest in the state but also in the United States. The tree was a gift from missionaries in India.

In 2023 Lahaina will have a birthday party to celebrate the Banyan Tree  being planted 150 years ago.

History

The banyan tree is located close to the port in the historical Lahaina town, which was the former capital of Hawaii. It is the oldest banyan tree in Hawaii.
 
The banyan tree, received as a gift by the Smith family in the 1870s, was planted on April 24, 1873, at Lahaina by William Owen Smith, the then sheriff of Lahaina. The tree was planted to mark the 50th anniversary of the arrival of the first Protestant mission in Maui; the mission had been invited to Maui by Queen Keōpūolani, wife of late King Kamehameha. It is not only the largest in Hawaii but also in the United States. The park is managed by the County of Maui and the Lahaina Restoration Foundation.

According to reports a royal ball was held under the tree in 1886 for King Kamehameha III on his birthday.

The Aloha Festivals Week has been held under this tree. The shade of the tree is used to shade vendors who hold events approximately 36 weekends per year.

At sunset there is a riot of noise as the birds fly back into the tree to find the best branch to sleep on.

There used to be a canal of water down one side of the tree and even though the canal is now a street it is thought to be a source of water for the tree roots.

Aerial roots help support the tree's huge limbs. To encourage the roots to reach the ground faster there were mayonnaise jars filled with water and tied to hang just below the roots. The roots wanted the water and it was thought that they did grow faster.

Many people look at this huge tree and think it is many trees joined together with limbs that have grown together.

Features

The banyan tree or Ficus benghalensis is from India, and it is known for unusual growth of its roots. The roots descend or sprout from the branches into aerial roots towards the ground where they form new trunks. This results in growth of many trunks around the main trunk. The banyan, native to India, is one of 60 types (out of reported 1,000 species in the world) of fig trees found throughout Hawaii. The trees are tall and “grow into mazes of additional trunks” and in Lahiana the tree covers an area of over half an acre. The banyan tree in Lahaina, when planted, was a sapling of  height. The growth of the roots was facilitated by the local Japanese gardening community, by hanging lanterns filled with water at suitable aerial roots. It is one of the sixty fig tree species in Hawaii and is said to be the largest tree both in Hawaii and in the United States. It has a circumference of about one fourth of a mile, and about a thousand people could congregate under it. A sight to watch at dusk time is the congregation of birds such as common myna birds (Acridotheres tristis) which roost in the branches of the tree for the night causing a cacophony of bird cries. The name "banyan" is derived from the Hindu word traders (banyans) who traded their products under the canopy of these trees.

Conservation
The tree has been subject to severe stress due to drought conditions, soil compaction from foot and vehicle traffic in the park, and also due to developmental activities in the vicinity. As a result, restrictions have been imposed on plying vehicles under the tree. Its sustenance has been ensured by the Lahaina Restoration Foundation by installing an irrigation system in the park.

See also
Banyan tree
Lahaina Banyan Court Park
List of individual trees

Gallery

References

Bibliography

Individual trees in Hawaii
Parks in Hawaii
Protected areas of Maui
Lahaina, Hawaii
Individual banyan trees